VV DOVO, short for Voetbalvereniging Door Ons Vrienden Opgericht, is a football club from Veenendaal, Netherlands.

History
The club was founded in 1933 as DVO and later changed its name to DOVO to set itself apart from a nearby club with an identical name. DOVO won section championships in lower leagues in 1936, 1937,1938, 1948, 1949, 1958, 1960, and 1967.

In 1970 DOVO promoted to the Eerste Klasse, where it initially won sections in 1975, 1977, 1979, 1989, 1991, and 1994. In 1974, it drew national attention by beating NSVV from Numansdorp, 11–0, while pointing out that DOVO players had made mistakes. In 1979 it also became the Saturday Champion of the Netherlands. From 1996 to 20017 it played in the Hoofdklasse, except for two seasons back in the Eerste when it took Eerste Klasse championships (2007 and 2011). In 1999 and 2004 DOVO won section championships in the Hoofdklasse. Since 2017, DOVO plays in the Derde Divisie.

Chief coach 

 Ries Hol (1964–1971)
 Nico van Miltenburg (1971–1973)
 Eli Voskamp (1973–1974)
 Jan de Bouter (1974–1976)
 Evert Mur (1976–1977)
 Jan de Jongh (1977–1984)
 Jan de Bouter (1985)
 Pierre Stevenaart (1985–1986)
 Jan Rab (1986–1989)
 Frans Vermeulen (1989–1991)
 Wim Eilander (1991–1994)
 Peter Boeve (1994–1995)
 Jan Rab (1995–1997)
 Rob McDonald (1997–1999)
 Bert van Sas (1999–2000)

 Jos Broers (2000–2002)
 Kees Oostermeijer (2002–2003)
 Henny Lee (2003–2005)
 Henne Oostermeijer (2005–2006)
 Raymond Verheijen (2006–2007)
 Rob McDonald (2007)
 Ton Verkerk (2007–2008)
 Koos Waslander (2009–2010)
 Rob McDonald (2010)
 Peter Visee (2010–2014)
 Jeroen Peters (2014–2016;  tech. mgr.  Hans Kraay Jr.)
 Bert van Sas (2016)
 Gert Kruys (2016–2019)
 Scott Calderwood (since 2019)

Relations with other teams 
In 2012, DOVO signed a partnership agreement with SBV Vitesse. This agreement was amended and renewed, for indefinite duration, in 2019.

DOVO has a rivalry with another Veenendaal football club, GVVV. In 2019, an indoors game between the clubs was ended after several physical fights.

References

External links
 Official site

 
Association football clubs established in 1933
1933 establishments in the Netherlands
Sport in Veenendaal
Football clubs in the Netherlands
Football clubs in Utrecht (province)